The 1996 Western Michigan Broncos football team represented Western Michigan University in the Mid-American Conference (MAC) during the 1996 NCAA Division I-A football season.  In their tenth and final season under head coach Al Molde, the Broncos compiled a 2–9 record (2–6 against MAC opponents), finished in ninth place in the MAC, and were outscored by their opponents, 304 to 208.  The team played its home games at Waldo Stadium in Kalamazoo, Michigan.

The team's statistical leaders included freshman quarterback Tim Lester with 2,189 passing yards, Bruno Heppell with 700 rushing yards, and Tony Knox with 754 receiving yards. Lester was named the MAC freshman of the year.

Molde was fired as the school's head football coach on November 20, 1996. In 10 years as head coach, he compiled a 62-47-2 record.  The firing followed a public dispute with athletic director Jim Weaver over Molde's contract.

Schedule

References

Western Michigan
Western Michigan Broncos football seasons
Western Michigan Broncos football